The Singapore Cruise Centre (abbrev: SCC; Chinese: 新加坡邮轮中心) is a cruise terminal located in the south of Singapore next to HarbourFront Centre in the vicinity of HarbourFront and in Keppel Harbour, near HarbourFront MRT station.

History
SCC was built in 1991 by the Port of Singapore Authority (PSA) and was upgraded at the cost of $23 million in 1998. It comprises two terminals, namely the International Passenger Terminal (IPT), and the Regional Ferry Terminal (RFT).

The Singapore Cruise Centre Pte Ltd, which is owned by PSA, took over management of the centre on 1 April 2003 when PSA Corporation divested its non-core businesses.

Additionally, SCC manages 2 other ferry terminals; Tanah Merah Ferry Terminal and Pasir Panjang Ferry Terminal. In total, SCC handles a throughput of over 7 million cruise and ferry passengers a year, of which about 950,000 are cruise passengers.

The existing terminals at HarbourFront were renovated in 2008 to optimize the use of available space. The entire level 2 is a restricted area, for the exclusive use of cruise and ferry passengers who have cleared immigration and security.

In 2013, SATS planned to buy over SCC for S$110 million. The acquisition plan was terminated in 2014.

In 2016, fully owned subsidiary SCC Travel Services Pte Ltd (STS) was formed to inspire travel to the destinations connected to its terminal network. STS is a B2C online travel agent retailing travel products from Bintan, Batam, Karimun and Singapore through its portal WOW Getaways.

Facilities
The regional terminal at HarbourFront has six berths for ferries to various ports on the island of Batam, Indonesia, as well as Tanjung Balai on the Karimun Islands.

The terminal at Tanah Merah has four berths for ferries to the island of Bintan, Indonesia, and the secondary Batam port of Nongsapura.

The terminal at Pasir Panjang has 4 berths for ferries that give passage to Singapore's industrial islands of Bukom and Semakau.

It underwent an upgrade in 2005 to improve its passenger handling facilities.

Awards
 Travel Weekly Asia - Best Cruise Port - 2016, 2017

References

External links
 Singapore river cruise guide
 

Ports and harbours of Singapore
Bukit Merah
Piers in Singapore
Ferry terminals in Singapore